Zhang Mo (born 28 July 1982) is a Chinese actor.

Zhang is noted for his roles as Liuzi in the film Let the Bullets Fly (2011).

Zhang has won the Best New Actor Award at the Golden TVS Annual Award and Chinese Young Generation Film Forum, Outstanding Supporting Actor Award at the China Image Film Festival, and New Performer Award at the Golden Phoenix Award, and received BQ Celebrity Score Award and Chinese Film Media Award nominations for Favorite Actor.

Early life
Zhang was born and raised in Chengdu, Sichuan, the son of Luo Xiuchun, an actress in Sichuan People's Art Theatre, and Zhang Guoli, a famous actor and director, Zhang's stepmother Deng Jie is also a famous actress.

Zhang graduated from Central Academy of Drama, where he majored in acting.

Acting career
Zhang had his first experience in front of the camera in 1997, and he was chosen to act as a support actor in Kangxi Travels, a historical television series starring his parents Zhang Guoli and Deng Jie.

Zhang acted in many television series, such as Winter Is Not Cold, Marriageable Age , and New Legend of Ji Gong.

In 2004, Zhang had a supporting role in The Eloquent Ji Xiaolan, a historical comedy television series starring Zhang Guoli, Zhang Tielin, Wang Gang (actor) and Yuan Li.

After playing minor roles in various films and television series, Zhang received his first leading role in a film called Let the Bullets Fly, for which he won Best New Actor Award at the Chinese Young Generation Film Forum and New Performer Award at the Golden Phoenix Award.

In 2011, Zhang appeared in a romantic comedy film Love Is Not Blind, it was released in November 2011 and grossed US$56 million.

In 2012, Zhang participated in Back to 1942, it had its premiere at the International Rome Film Festival on 11 November 2012. At the same year, Zhang won the Outstanding Supporting Actor at the China Image Film Festival for his performance in Lethal Hostage, and was nominated for Favorite Actor Award at the BQ Celebrity Score Award.

Filmography

Film

Television

Awards

References

External links

1982 births
Male actors from Chengdu
Living people
Central Academy of Drama alumni
Chinese male film actors
Chinese male television actors